Izidor (Iso) Kršnjavi (22 April 1845 – 3 February 1927) was a Croatian painter, art historian, curator and politician.

Biography
Born in Našice, his first art lessons were obtained in Osijek, where he studied with Hugo Conrad von Hötzendorf. He then went to Vienna to study philosophy and art history. At this time, he was already providing aesthetic and philosophical articles to Croatian journals. He later studied at the Academy of Fine Arts, Munich and lived in Italy from 1872–77, where he copied the old masters.

With the help of Josip Juraj Strossmayer, who he had met in Rome, he became a professor of archaeology and art history at the University of Zagreb. The next year, he helped establish the Society of Arts, and was, for many years, it secretary and spokesman. He also served as the first Director of the Strossmayer Gallery of Old Masters and was one of the founders of the Museum of Arts and Crafts.

In 1884, he came into conflict with Strossmayer and his supporters in the People's Party, where he supported the pro-Hungarian faction, which allowed him to serve in the Croatian Parliament 1884-87. From 1887 to 1891, he studied law and became the Minister of Education and Religion in the Károly Khuen-Héderváry administration. While in that office, he established several schools, including one for the blind and deaf, introduced physical education classes and helped to form the foundation for a unified school system. He had to leave the ministry in 1897, after a protest in which he burned a Hungarian flag. He returned to the University and, in 1906, joined the Party of Rights. Shortly thereafter, he began painting again.

In addition to being a painter and critic, he also translated Dante's Divine Comedy into Croatian and was the author of poems, travelogues and two novels. He died in Zagreb.

In Croatian film Countess Dora (1993) he is played by Relja Bašić.

References

Sources

External links
Essekeri: Biography of Isidor Kršnjavi (English version in preparation)

1845 births
1927 deaths
Croatian politicians
Croatian art historians
Croatian writers
19th-century Croatian painters
20th-century Croatian painters
Croatian male painters
19th-century Croatian male artists
20th-century Croatian male artists
Burials at Mirogoj Cemetery